Tory Collins is a former American football player who played in the NFL, CFL, AFL and the Indoor Football League.

Playing career

College career
Collins was an undrafted defensive tackle from Northwestern State University. He transferred to Northwestern State after originally playing at LSU.

Professional career
Collins played in three preseason games with the Chicago Bears during their 2007 season. In those games he recorded a single tackle in a loss to the Cleveland Browns. Collins was cut from the Bears' active roster before the 2007 season.

Personal life
Collins hails from New Orleans, Louisiana, where his family lived until their home was destroyed by Hurricane Katrina in 2005. He cited his desire to help his family as one of his biggest motivations to excel as a professional athlete. Collins also played to honor the memory of Marquise Hill, a former NFL player and close friend, who died on May 28, 2007.

References

External links
 Chicago Bears bio
 Sports Illustrated Draft Profile

Living people
American football defensive tackles
LSU Tigers football players
Northwestern State Demons football players
Chicago Bears players
Alaska Wild players
Sioux Falls Storm players
Year of birth missing (living people)
1980s births